The Rainbow Coalition was an antiracist, anticlass multicultural movement founded April 4, 1969 in Chicago, Illinois by Fred Hampton of the Black Panther Party, along with William "Preacherman" Fesperman of the Young Patriots Organization and José Cha Cha Jiménez, founder of the Young Lords. It was the first of several 20th century black-led organizations to use the "rainbow coalition" concept.

Some members of the Young Patriots included Jack (Junebug) Boykin, Bobby Joe Mcginnis and Hy Thurman who worked with Field Marshall Bobby Lee of the Black Panthers. Hampton first met Jimenez in Chicago's Lincoln Park neighborhood the day after the Young Lords were in the news, having occupied the police community workshop meeting of the 18th District Police Station. Hampton was arrested twice in February 1969 with Jimenez at the Wicker Park Welfare Office. Both were charged with Mob Action during peaceful pickets of the welfare office protesting mistreatment of the patrons.

The Rainbow Coalition soon included various radical socialist community groups like the Lincoln Park Poor People's Coalition, later, the coalition was joined nationwide by the Students for a Democratic Society ("SDS"), the Brown Berets, the American Indian Movement and the Red Guard Party. In April 1969, Hampton called several press conferences to announce that this "Rainbow Coalition" had formed. Some of the things the coalition engaged in joint action against was poverty, corruption, racism, police brutality, and substandard housing. The participating groups supported each other at protests, strikes, and demonstrations where they had a common cause.

The coalition later included many other local groups like Rising Up Angry, and Mothers and Others. The Coalition also brokered treaties to end crime and gang violence. Hampton, Jimenez and their colleagues believed that the Richard J. Daley Democratic Party machine in Chicago used gang wars to consolidate their own political positions by gaining funding for law enforcement and dramatizing crime rather than underlying social issues.

The coalition eventually collapsed under duress from constant harassment by local and federal law enforcement, including the murder of Hampton.

Legacy

The phrase "rainbow coalition" was co-opted over the years by Reverend Jesse Jackson, who eventually appropriated the name in forming his own, more moderate coalition, Rainbow/PUSH. Some scholars, including Peniel Joseph, assert that the original rainbow coalition concept was a prerequisite for the multicultural coalition that Barack Obama built his political career upon.

Jeffrey Haas, a lawyer who represented the BPP after Hampton's assassination, praised some of Hampton's politics, stating that his work in unifying movements are things one can learn from him. However, Haas was critical towards the way Hampton ran the BPP hierarchical organization. Haas praised the horizontal structure of Black Lives Matter stating: "They may also have picked up on the vulnerability of a hierarchal movement where you have one leader, which makes the movement very vulnerable if that leader is imprisoned, killed, or otherwise compromised. I think the fact that Black Lives Matter says, 'We're leader-full, not leaderless,' perhaps makes them less vulnerable to this kind of government assault."

See also
Political history of Chicago

References

Hy Thurman, Revolutionary Hillbilly, Notes From The Struggle On The Edge Of The Rainbow, Regent Press Publishing, 2021.

External links
National Young Lords
Grand Valley State University: Young Lords in Lincoln Park Collection
The (Original) Ra
The Young Patriots & the original Rainbow Coalition
The Rainbow Coalition at BPP 50th Oakland

American Indian Movement
Black Panther Party
Defunct American political movements
Defunct left-wing political party alliances
Defunct political party alliances in North America
Defunct socialist organizations in the United States
Political history of Illinois
Political party alliances in the United States
Politics and race in the United States